The Philadelphia 76ers Training Complex is a 125,000-square-foot athletic facility and office building in Camden, New Jersey, which houses the training center and corporate offices of the Philadelphia 76ers of the National Basketball Association. It opened in September 2016.

History
Prior to the opening of the new facility, the team practiced at the Philadelphia College of Osteopathic Medicine, in Bala Cynwyd, while business-side operations were located at The Navy Yard, in South Philadelphia.

In 2012 the 76ers were looking for a new training facility. It took two more years to find a location for the project. Although the project was poised to be located at the Philadelphia Naval Yard, developer AthenianRazak, who was managing the project, brought the possibility of locating in Camden to the team, citing the newly enacted Grow NJ tax credit program. As a result, the team found a property at the Camden Waterfront and started construction in 2015. The 'state-of-the-art' facility was made possible in part by  $82 million in tax credits approved by the New Jersey Economic Development Authority.

Features
The complex has two regulation NBA courts with 12 baskets. The courts are available for players and coaches use at any time. Also the building has it own players restaurant with its own full menu, along a private balcony and film and press room. A 2,800-square-foot player locker room, and state-of-the-art performance, wellness, recovery, and hydrotherapy room with recovery pool, a fully operational gym, rehab center, and players and coaches film and conference rooms.

Notable features
 2 full-size NBA courts with 10 baskets
 Full service restaurant and cafeteria with smoothie and nutritious center
 9,000 gallon Recovery pool
 2 hot tubs
 2,800-square-foot players locker room
 6,000-square-foot weight and training center 
 3 Players meeting rooms
 2 coaching rooms
 3,000-square-foot film room with 25 movie chairs
 Over 100,000-square-feet of office space 
 9,000-square-foot media and player/coaching interview room
 Full recording studio

References

External links
 

Philadelphia 76ers venues
Buildings and structures in Camden, New Jersey
Event venues established in 2016
2016 establishments in New Jersey